Space Force is an American workplace comedy streaming television series created by Greg Daniels and Steve Carell for Netflix. It centers on a group of people tasked with establishing the sixth branch of the United States Armed Forces, the United States Space Force. It stars Steve Carell, John Malkovich, Ben Schwartz, Diana Silvers, Lisa Kudrow, Tawny Newsome and  Jimmy O. Yang. It premiered on Netflix on May 29, 2020, to mixed reviews. In November 2020, it was renewed for a second season which premiered on February 18, 2022, to generally favourable reviews. In April 2022, the series was cancelled after two seasons.

Premise 
Space Force is a workplace comedy-drama series that centers on a group of people tasked with establishing the sixth branch of the United States Armed Forces, the United States Space Force. Season One follows the efforts of General Mark Naird (Carell) to get "boots on the moon" by 2024, per the president's orders.

Cast and characters

Main
 Steve Carell as General Mark R. Naird, the Space Force's first Chief of Space Operations
 John Malkovich as Dr. Adrian Mallory, Space Force chief scientist
 Ben Schwartz as F. Tony Scarapiducci, Space Force social media director
 Diana Silvers as Erin Naird, Mark's teenage daughter
 Tawny Newsome as Captain Angela Ali, a Space Force helicopter pilot, and later, astronaut. In the final minutes of the last episode of season 2, she is promoted to Major.
 Jimmy O. Yang as Dr. Chan Kaifang, Dr. Mallory's lead assistant (season 2; recurring season 1)
 Don Lake as Brigadier General Bradley Gregory, Naird's adjutant (season 2; recurring season 1)

Recurring

Military
 Noah Emmerich as General Kick Grabaston, Chief of Staff of the United States Air Force
 Alex Sparrow as Captain Yuri "Bobby" Telatovich, a Russian Space Forces liaison with the Space Force, spy, and illegitimate son of Vladimir Putin
 Roy Wood Jr. as Colonel Bert Mellows, U.S. Army liaison to the Space Force
 Jane Lynch as Admiral Mayweather, Chief of Naval Operations
 Diedrich Bader as General Rongley, Chief of Staff of the United States Army
 Patrick Warburton as General Dabney Stramm, Commandant of the Marine Corps
 Larry Joe Campbell as Admiral Louis Biffoont, Commandant of the Coast Guard
 Spencer House as Duncan Tabner, a Space Force security guard from Alabama
 Jamison Webb as Major Lee Baxter
 Brandon Molale as Captain Clarke Luffinch, USAF

Politicians
 Dan Bakkedahl as John Blandsmith, Secretary of Defense (Season 1)
 Ginger Gonzaga as Anabela Ysidro-Campos, credited and referred to as "the Angry Young Congresswoman" and also known as AYC, a parody of Alexandria Ocasio-Cortez
 Concetta Tomei as Representative Pitosi, a parody of Speaker of the House Nancy Pelosi
 Alan Blumenfeld as Senator Schugler, a parody of Senate Majority Leader Chuck Schumer
 Tim Meadows as Secretary of Defense (Season 2)

Scientists
 Jessica St. Clair as Kelly King, structural engineer and civil contractor
 Thomas Ohrstrom as Dr. Vandeveld
 Nancy Lantis as Dr. Wolf
 Punam Patel as Dr. Ranatunga
 JayR Tinaco as Dr. Xyler

Family
 Fred Willard as Fred Naird, Mark's father (season 1)
 Lisa Kudrow as Maggie Naird, Mark's wife

Other
 Chris Gethard as Eddie Broser
 Landon Ashworth as Gabe Eli
 Owen Daniels as Obie Hanrahan
 Aparna Nancherla as Pella Bhat
 Hector Duran as Julio Díaz-José
 Carolyn Wilson as Louise Papaleo
 Vivis Colombetti as Hilde
 Amanda Lund as Anna
 Marc Sully Saint-Fleur as Jean Baptiste Bosou
 Scott Michael Morgan as Emmett Bunyan

Guest
 Rahul Nath as Dr. Chandreshekar
 Tommy Cook as Representative Bob White
 Asif Ali as Captain Dave Powers, USSF
 Michael Hitchcock as Jerome Lalosz
 Alice Wetterlund as Major Jane Pike, USSF
 Punkie Johnson as Staff Sergeant Kiki Rhodes, USSF
 Kaitlin Olson as Edison Jaymes, "an Elizabeth Holmes-esque tech wiz"
 Janina Gavankar as Hannah Howard, Jaymes' social media manager
 Bruce Locke as General Tsengjun, a Chinese general in the People's Liberation Army
 Kelvin Han Yee as General Gao Xiaoling, a Chinese general in the People's Liberation Army and the commander of People's Liberation Army Strategic Support Force
 Megan Grano as Reporter No. 2 (Meredith)
 Jessica McKenna as Participant No. 2
 Patton Oswalt as Captain Lancaster, an astronaut stationed in space (season 2)
 Terry Crews as General Aggroad, the new Air Force Chief of Staff (season 2)
 Tim Chiou as Chinese astronaut Dr. Lim (season 2)

Episodes

Season 1 (2020)

Season 2 (2022)

Production

Development
On January 16, 2019, it was announced that Netflix had given the production a series order for a ten-episode first season. The series is co-created by Greg Daniels and Steve Carell and is executive produced by Daniels, Carell, and Howard Klein through 3 Arts Entertainment. On November 13, 2020, the series was renewed for a second season, produced in Vancouver to lower the show's budget. Producer Daniels explained that they would refocus the tone and emphases of the show for the second season and that they had brought veteran comedy director Ken Kwapis in to help achieve that goal. On April 29, 2022, Netflix canceled the series after two seasons.

Casting
Alongside the initial series order announcement, it was confirmed that Carell would star in the series.

On September 26, 2019, it was announced that John Malkovich, Ben Schwartz, Diana Silvers and Tawny Newsome had joined that series as main cast and Jimmy O. Yang, Alex Sparrow and Don Lake as recurring cast. In October 2019, Noah Emmerich, Fred Willard and Jessica St. Clair joined the cast in recurring roles. In April 2020, it was announced Lisa Kudrow had joined the cast in a recurring role. In May 2020, it was reported that Jane Lynch and Roy Wood Jr. were cast in recurring roles.

The series features the last television performance by Willard, who died on May 15, 2020, two weeks before the show's release.

Filming
Principal photography for the first season commenced in Los Angeles, California, on October 1, 2019, and ended on January 10, 2020. Most exterior shots of the fictional Space Force base were shot on the campus of California State University, Dominguez Hills. Filming for season 2 began in late May 2021 in Vancouver and wrapped in late June 2021.

Release
The series was released on Netflix on May 29, 2020. At their Q2 report meeting in July 2020, Netflix reported the series had been viewed by about 40 million households since its release. In August 2020, it was estimated that 8.3% of subscribers had watched the series over its first month. The second season premiered on February 18, 2022. The second season featured on Netflix 's global top 10s for 1 week recording 12.32 million hours watched globally.

Reception

Audience viewership
At their Q2 report meeting in July 2020, Netflix reported the series had been viewed by about 40 million households since its release. In August 2020, it was estimated that 8.3% of subscribers had watched the series over its first month. The second season featured on Netflix 's global top 10s for 1 week recording 12.32 million hours watched globally.

Critical response

Season 1
On review aggregator Rotten Tomatoes, the first season of the series has an approval rating of 38% based on 96 reviews, with an average rating of 5.80/10. The site's critics consensus reads: "An all-star cast and blockbuster-worthy special effects aren't enough to keep Space Forces uneven blend of earnestness and satire from spinning quickly out of comedic orbit." On Metacritic, it has a weighted average score of 49 out of 100, based on 40 critics, indicating "mixed or average reviews".

Richard Roeper of the Chicago Sun-Times praised Carell, for his "impeccable comedic timing and his uncanny ability to play yet another character who's often an insufferable buffoon with not a speck of self-awareness" but criticized the hit-and-miss humor, and unrealized potential, saying "Don’t get me wrong; I enjoyed Space Force... It’s just with all the credentials of the main contributors, we hoped for greatness and got ... pretty good." Caroline Framke of Variety wrote: "For all the heft behind it, Space Force should be an easy win. Ten episodes later, it's safer to say that Space Force is really just okay." Nick Allen, writing for RogerEbert.com says, "Space Force has the supporting characters to color its cringe-worthy absurdity," praising its cast but calling out on the story's incompetence. The Guardian gave the first season of the series only 2 out of 5 saying, "Above all, despite occasional laughs to be gleaned from the twist that Malkovich can give the most unpromising of lines, Space Force is not funny, which makes it hard to class as a comedy." Joshua Rivera from The Verge gave Space Force a disappointing review stating that "the show falls apart before it even gets going", chiefly because it strays away from the sharp political satire that shows such as Veep had nailed and instead "adheres to the conventions of the workplace comedy."

Season 2
On review aggregator Rotten Tomatoes, the second season of the series has an approval rating of 90% based on 10 reviews, with an average rating of 7.1/10. On Metacritic, it has a weighted average score of 61 out of 100 based on 4 critics, indicating "generally favorable reviews".

Nick Allen of RogerEbert.com said "Space Force is good, or good enough, with what matters most to it." Variety Caroline Framke opined that "The result isn’t half as sleek or ambitious as the initial season, but the show at least seems much more comfortable in its own skin."

Accolades

References

External links
 
 

2020 American television series debuts
2022 American television series endings
2020s American LGBT-related comedy television series
2020s American workplace comedy television series
English-language Netflix original programming
Gay-related television shows
Fiction about the People's Liberation Army
Television shows about the United States Space Force
Television series by 3 Arts Entertainment
Television shows set in Colorado
Television shows filmed in Los Angeles
Television shows filmed in Vancouver
Television series created by Greg Daniels